Lee Yang (born 12 August 1995) is a Taiwanese badminton player and 2020 Olympics men's doubles champion.

Career 
Lee played in the men's doubles with Lee Jhe-huei. They were champions in 2016 at the Vietnam Open Grand Prix. In 2015, together they entered the 2015 Chinese Taipei Masters Grand Prix, 2015 Vietnam Open Grand Prix, and 2015 Korea Masters Grand Prix Gold. In 2016 they entered the 2016 Chinese Taipei Open Grand Prix Gold, 2016 Thailand Open Grand Prix Gold and 2016 Dutch Open Grand Prix. He won the men's doubles title at the 2017 French Open. In 2018, he competed at the Asian Games and won bronze medals in the men's doubles and team events.

In 2021, at the 2020 Tokyo Olympics, he partnered with Wang Chi-lin to defeat the 2018 World Champion pairing of Li Junhui and Liu Yuchen in the final. They became the first unseeded pair to win an Olympic gold in the men's doubles event and the first to win a gold in badminton for Chinese Taipei.

Achievements

Olympic Games 
Men's doubles

Asian Games 
Men's doubles

Summer Universiade 
Men's doubles

Mixed doubles

World University Championships 
Men's doubles

Mixed doubles

BWF World Tour (7 titles, 4 runners-up) 
The BWF World Tour, which was announced on 19 March 2017 and implemented in 2018, is a series of elite badminton tournaments sanctioned by the Badminton World Federation (BWF). The BWF World Tour is divided into levels of World Tour Finals, Super 1000, Super 750, Super 500, Super 300, and the BWF Tour Super 100.

Men's doubles

BWF Superseries (1 title) 
The BWF Superseries, which was launched on 14 December 2006 and implemented in 2007, was a series of elite badminton tournaments, sanctioned by the Badminton World Federation (BWF). BWF Superseries levels were Superseries and Superseries Premier. A season of Superseries consisted of twelve tournaments around the world that had been introduced since 2011. Successful players were invited to the Superseries Finals, which were held at the end of each year.

Men's doubles

  BWF Superseries Finals tournament
  BWF Superseries Premier tournament
  BWF Superseries tournament

BWF Grand Prix (3 titles, 2 runners-up) 
The BWF Grand Prix had two levels, the Grand Prix and Grand Prix Gold. It was a series of badminton tournaments sanctioned by the Badminton World Federation (BWF) and played between 2007 and 2017.

Men's doubles

  BWF Grand Prix Gold tournament
  BWF Grand Prix tournament

BWF International Challenge/Series (1 runner-up) 
Men's doubles

  BWF International Challenge tournament
  BWF International Series tournament
  BWF Future Series tournament

References

External links 

 

1995 births
Living people
Sportspeople from Taipei
Taiwanese people of Hoklo descent
Taiwanese male badminton players
Badminton players at the 2020 Summer Olympics
Olympic badminton players of Taiwan
Olympic gold medalists for Taiwan
Olympic medalists in badminton
Medalists at the 2020 Summer Olympics
Badminton players at the 2018 Asian Games
Asian Games bronze medalists for Chinese Taipei
Asian Games medalists in badminton
Medalists at the 2018 Asian Games
Universiade gold medalists for Chinese Taipei
Universiade bronze medalists for Chinese Taipei
Universiade medalists in badminton
Medalists at the 2017 Summer Universiade